Ernest Bengrey Denton (21 April 1881 – 26 April 1962) was an Australian rules footballer who played a single game with Melbourne in the Victorian Football League (VFL) in 1905.

Notes

External links 

1881 births
Australian rules footballers from Victoria (Australia)
Melbourne Football Club players
1962 deaths